XEYC-AM is a radio station on 1460 AM in Ciudad Juárez, Chihuahua, Mexico, part of the Radio Fórmula talk radio network.

History

XEYC received its first concession on February 25, 1949. It operated on 1460 kHz with 1,000 watts and was owned by and named for Ysela Fernández Caballero de Yañez. The station was known as "Radio Ysela". Fernández Caballero died on June 21, 1972.

XEYC was sold to XEYC, S.A., in 1980. In 1998, the concession was sold directly to Fórmula in the person of Rogerio Azcárraga Madero. The 1999 concession listed XEYC on 1030 kHz with 5,000 watts day and 500 watts night. The 2009 concession lists 1460 kHz as the frequency, but promotional materials mentioned 1030 AM until XEYC returned to 1460 on May 27, 2018.

References

1949 establishments in Mexico
News and talk radio stations in Mexico
Radio Fórmula
Radio stations established in 1949
Radio stations in Chihuahua
Spanish-language radio stations